was a Grand Prix motorcycle road racer from Japan. Tanaka began his Grand Prix career in 1960 with Honda. He enjoyed his best season in 1962 when he won the 125cc Nations Grand Prix and finished the season in sixth place in the 125cc world championship.

References

1937 births
Japanese motorcycle racers
50cc World Championship riders
125cc World Championship riders
250cc World Championship riders
Isle of Man TT riders
2015 deaths